First Weapon Drawn is the fourth studio album by American hip hop trio Czarface, which consists of rapper and Wu-Tang Clan member Inspectah Deck and underground hip hop duo 7L & Esoteric. It was released on April 22, 2017 via Silver Age. The album peaked at number 44 on the Independent Albums and number 16 on the Heatseekers Albums in the United States.

Track listing

Personnel
Seamus Ryan – executive producer, additional vocals
Jason Richard Hunter – executive producer
George Andrinopoulos – executive producer
Todd Spadafore – producer
Jeremy Page – producer, instruments
Yukihiro Kanesaka – instruments
Kendra Morris – additional vocals (track 1)
Kelly Hammer – additional vocals
Troy Hudson – additional vocals
Sam Merrick – drums (track 4)
Zack Martin – drums (track 6)
Andy Bauer – drums (track 10)
Wes Garland – mastering
Jason Bitner – mastering
Alfredo Rico-Dimas – design and layout
Gilberto Aguirre Mata – artwork
Lamour Supreme – cover art

Charts

References

External links

2017 albums
Czarface albums
7L & Esoteric albums
Inspectah Deck albums
Collaborative albums